Johannes Gaultherus van der Corput (4 September 1890 – 16 September 1975) was a Dutch mathematician, working in the field of analytic number theory.

He was appointed professor at the University of Fribourg (Switzerland) in 1922, at the University of Groningen in 1923,
and at the University of Amsterdam in 1946.
He was one of the founders of the Mathematisch Centrum in Amsterdam, of which he also was the first director. From 1953 on  he worked in the United States at the University of California, Berkeley, and the University of Wisconsin–Madison.

He introduced the van der Corput lemma, a technique for creating an upper bound on the measure of a set drawn from harmonic analysis, and the van der Corput theorem on equidistribution modulo 1.

He became member of the Royal Netherlands Academy of Arts and Sciences in 1929, and foreign member in 1953. He was a Plenary Speaker of the ICM in 1936 in Oslo.

See also

 van der Corput inequality
 van der Corput lemma (harmonic analysis)
 van der Corput's method
 van der Corput sequence
 van der Corput's theorem

References

1890 births
1975 deaths
Scientists from Rotterdam
20th-century Dutch mathematicians
Members of the Royal Netherlands Academy of Arts and Sciences
Number theorists
Academic staff of the University of Fribourg
Academic staff of the University of Groningen
Academic staff of the University of Amsterdam
University of California, Berkeley College of Letters and Science faculty
University of Wisconsin–Madison faculty